Christine "Cristien" Renate Polak (4 April 1954 - 26 September 2022) was a Surinamese politician.

Polak died on 26 September 2022.

References

1954 births
2022 deaths
21st-century Surinamese politicians
21st-century Surinamese women politicians
Government ministers of Suriname
Women government ministers of Suriname
University of Groningen alumni
National Democratic Party (Suriname) politicians